is a railway station located in the city of Hitachi, Ibaraki Prefecture, Japan operated by the East Japan Railway Company (JR East). It is also a freight depot for the Japan Freight Railway Company (JR Freight).

Lines
Hitachi Station is served by the Jōban Line, and is located 146.9 km from the official starting point of the line at Nippori Station.

Station layout
The station is an elevated station with one side platform and one island platform. The station has a Midori no Madoguchi staffed  ticket office.

Platforms

History
It was renamed to its present name on 20 October 1939. The station was absorbed into the JR East network upon the privatization of the Japanese National Railways (JNR) on 1 April 1987. The current station building was completed in April 2012.

Passenger statistics
In fiscal 2019, the station was used by an average of 10,789 passengers daily (boarding passengers only).

Surrounding area
Hitachi City Hall
 Hitachi Post Office
Mitsubishi Hitachi Power Systems, Ltd.

See also
 List of railway stations in Japan

References

External links

 Station information JR East Station Information 

Railway stations in Ibaraki Prefecture
Jōban Line
Railway stations in Japan opened in 1897
Hitachi, Ibaraki
Stations of Japan Freight Railway Company